Panam Ningthou is a God in Meitei mythology and religion. He is the protector of crops, especially paddy from hailstorm and thunder. According to legends, He ignited fire for the first time by rubbing flints. He is one of the Umang Lai deities.

History 
God Panam Ningthou has his major cult center in Andro village. The Andro village in Imphal East district of present day Manipur is an ancient village. People of this village worship fire that is kept burning from the time of Poireiton Khunthokpa (34 BC-18 BC). The fire is kept in the Chakpa Panam Ningthou Meihoupirol (lit. Panam Ningthou sacred burning fireplace).

According to R. Constantine, the fire burning in Andro is the oldest man-made fire in India. It has been burning without break for centuries.

Description 
According to Thomas Callan Hodson (T.C. Hodson), Panam Ningthou is a rain and weather God of the Meitei people of Manipur. He recorded his description in his monograph "The Meitheis" published in 1908.

Mythology 
When it was one or two days before the Lai Haraoba festival of God Lainingthou Panam Ningthou begins, the God came to his temple in the form of a ball of light. He came flying from the east. He landed at a part of the Nongmaiching Hill. Sometimes, some people of Andro claimed to see that ball of light, even at other times of the year.

God Lainingthou Panam Ningthou has a wife named Leimaren Sanarik Chaning Khombi. Some people believed that she might be of Burmese origin, though it's not certain. So, the God went to Burma to meet her from time to time.

Festival and worship 
God Panam Ningthou is mainly worshipped by the people of Loi caste of Meitei ethnicity in Manipur. He has his major cult center in Andro village of Imphal East district of Manipur.

Shakespeare noted that the Loi people regarded God Panam Ningthou as a special deity of the Meitei king. He further noted that the King himself provided sacrificial animals to the God. Buffalo was one among the sacrificial animals used to be sacrificed during the Lai Haraoba festival. Pigs were sacrificed when there was no Lai Haraoba festival. Whenever there was any suspicion of danger to the Meitei king, the King would send a pig and a cock to be sacrificed to God Panam Ningthou of Andro.

The Chakpa Haraoba (one of the 4 types of Lai Haraoba festival) is annually celebrated in honor of God Panam Ningthou. The festive occasion falls in the Meitei lunar month of Lamta (March-April interface month). The festival starts from the first Sunday of the Lamta month.

During the 9 day long festival, no outsiders of Andro are allowed to stay at the village. In modern times, notice is issued one month before the festival begins through mass media like television, newspaper and radio. The notice informs outsiders to leave the place as it is about to begin the festival. Natives of Andro may come to Andro before the festival starts. Once the festival begins, no one is allowed to either leave from or come to the village. People who have converted into another religion are not allowed to participate in the religious festival even if they are native of Andro. There are some Christian converts and Hindu converts in Andro. 
During the festival, people of Andro village wear black clothes as a custom. Besides Panam Ningthou, there are twelve other deities worshipped in Andro. During the Lai Haraoba festivals of these deities, outsiders of Andro can witness the event. The festivals in their honor are done separately from that of Panam Ningthou. But the festival of Pureiromba can be done together with that of Panam Ningthou. At this too, outsiders can witness the event but the place of worship is different from the exclusive one of Panam Ningthou.

During the Haraoba of Panam Ningthou, there is no shortage of meat and wine. Boys and girls play important role in the festival.

Temple 
The Temple of Panam Ningthou is in Andro, Imphal East, Manipur. It is also the Loishang (English: Office) to the representatives of the panas (English: State Divisions). Sacred items are kept inside the temple. One house each for two Panas was constructed near the Loishang. Two dormitories for boys and girls are also built.

The sanctum of God Lainingthou Panam Ningthou and Goddess Leimaren Sanarik Chaning Khombi are located in the right side corner and the left side corner respectively as one enters the room.

Association with other gods 
According to the Thalon text, Panam Ningthou was one of the 5 gods of 5 different places of the Selloi Langmai Hill. The cults of these five gods were integrated into that of a single God with the name "Langmai Ningthou" (lit. King of the Langmais). The personal names became the aliases or various forms of the God. With this, the tribal society of the Selloi Langmai people evolved into a chiefdom. This chiefdom later rose to the Angom clan.

Namesake

Panam Ningthou Semba 
There is a real servant class named Panam Ningthou Semba. It takes care of the articles (things) related to polo for the Meitei royalty. There are seven grades of officers in this group. The grades are (1) Sellungba Ahal, (2) Sellungba Naha, (3) Pakhan-lakpa, (4) Naharakpa, (5) Yaphi Ahal, (6) Yaphi Naha and (7) Sennakhal.

Gallery

References

External links 

 INTERNET ARCHIVE, Panam Ningthou
 E-PAO, Panam Ningthou
 
 
 
 

Abundance gods
Agricultural gods
Arts gods
Crafts gods
Creator gods
Domestic and hearth gods
Earth gods
Fertility gods
Fire gods
Food gods
Food deities
Fortune gods
Harvest gods
Health gods
Kings in Meitei mythology
Life-death-rebirth gods
Maintenance gods
Meitei deities
Names of God in Sanamahism
Nature gods
Ningthou
Peace gods
Savior gods
Time and fate deities
Time and fate gods
Tutelary gods